The 89th season of the Campeonato Gaúcho kicked off on January 20 and ended on April 19. Repeating the 2008 final score, Internacional clinched their 39th title – second consecutive – after beating Caxias 8–1 in the Taça Fábio Koff final. As Internacional had already won Taça Fernando Carvalho, beating city rivals Grêmio 2–1 in the final, Campeonato Gaúcho finals were unnecessary.

The competition had 16 clubs divided into two groups. In the first part, called Taça Fernando Carvalho teams from one group played against teams from the other group. In the second part, called Taça Fábio Koff, clubs played inside their group. On both parts, top four teams from each group qualified to play-offs, when every round was decided in a single game. Winners of each part were supposed to play finals, but as Internacional won both, they were declared champions without it.

Teams

System 
The 16 clubs will be divided into two groups.

Group 1: Internacional, Juventude, Avenida, Esportivo, Veranópolis, Brasil and Internacional (SM);
Group 2: Grêmio, Caxias, Santa Cruz, Ypiranga, Ulbra, Sapucaiense, São José and São Luiz.

The tournament will be divided in two stages. In the first one, called Taça Fernando Carvalho (Fernando Carvalho Cup, in reference to former Internacional chairman, winner of the 2006 Copa Libertadores and FIFA Club World Cup), teams from one group will play in single round-robin format against clubs of the other group. Top four teams in each group advance to quarterfinals. In home-and-away system, winners qualify to semifinals and then, to the finals. Later, in Taça Fábio Koff (Fábio Koff Cup, in reference to former Grêmio chairman, winner of the 1983 Intercontinental Cup, 1983 and 1995 Copa Libertadores), teams in the same group will play each other  once.  Again, top four teams will play quarterfinals, winners play semifinals and then finals. If the same club wins both stages, they will be declared champions. Otherwise, a final will be disputed in home-and-away system.

Background 
On January 15, just one week before its debut in the championship, a bus carrying all Brasil squad crashed in the 150th kilometer of the BR-392 road, in the city of Canguçu, southern Rio Grande do Sul. The team was heading back to Pelotas after beating Santa Cruz 2–1 in a friendly match played in Vale do Sol, near Santa Cruz do Sul. The bus plunged off a 130-foot ravine after the driver lost its control when approaching a turn. The accident caused the death of three members of the team: goalkeeper trainer Giovani Guimarães, defender Régis Gouveia and striker Claudio Milar. Milar is considered to be one of the most notable players in the history of the club, scoring 110 goals in approximately 200 caps. Several other players sustained injuries. Among the injured was Copa Libertadores 1995 winner and 1996 Olympic bronze-medalist Danrlei.

After the disaster, several clubs offered to loan players for free in order to help Brasil to play in the tournament. Also, companies as Multisom and Banrisul signed special sponsorship deals to provide financial support. On January 19, club managers and the Rio Grande do Sul Football Federation decided that Brasil should skip their first 5 matches, debuting on February 3 against Santa Cruz.

Taça Fernando Carvalho

Group A

Standings

Group B

Standings

Results

Playoffs

* Homeground advantage

The Final

Taça Fábio Koff

Group A

Standings

Results

Group B

Standings

Results

Playoffs

* Homeground advantage

Final

Finals
Finals were scheduled to be played on April 26 & May 3, but as Internacional won both Taça Fernando Carvalho and Taça Fábio Koff, finals became unnecessary.

Overall table
Considering only group matches of both Fernando Carvalho and Fábio Koff trophies, the bottom two teams in overall table will be relegated to play lower levels in 2010.

References
 Tournament results at RSSSF Brazil

Campeonato Gaúcho seasons
Campeonato Gaucho, 2009